Alois Leodolter (born 16 August 1931) is an Austrian skier. He competed in the Nordic combined event at the 1960 Winter Olympics.

References

External links
 

1931 births
Living people
Austrian male Nordic combined skiers
Olympic Nordic combined skiers of Austria
Nordic combined skiers at the 1960 Winter Olympics
Sportspeople from Styria
People from Bruck an der Mur District